"Suffocate" is the debut single by American heavy metal band Motograter. The song was featured in the 2003 remake to The Texas Chainsaw Massacre.

Music video
A music video was released for the song and shows footage of the band performing the song inter-cut with footage from the film The Texas Chainsaw Massacre.

Personnel
 Ivan "Ghost" Moody – vocals
 Matt "Nuke" Nunes – guitar
 J.R. Swartz – guitar
 Xavier Montoya – bass
 Bruce "Grater" Butler – motograter
 Chris "Crispy" Binns – drums
 Joey "Smur" Krzywonski – percussion
 Zak "The Waz" Ward – samples

References

2003 debut singles
Elektra Records singles
Motograter songs
2003 songs